The Viking Dragonfly is an American amateur-built aircraft, designed by Bob Walters  and produced by Viking Aircraft LLC of Elkhorn, Wisconsin. The aircraft is supplied as a kit or as plans for amateur construction.

Design and development
The Dragonfly is a two-seater aircraft that features a tandem wing layout with a forward wing mounted low and the other behind the cockpit in a shoulder position, a two-seats-in-side-by-side configuration enclosed cockpit under a bubble canopy, fixed landing gear and a single engine in tractor configuration.

The aircraft is constructed from composites, based on construction techniques pioneered by Burt Rutan at Rutan Aircraft Factory (RAF). The airframe design is visually similar to the RAF's Quickie 2, which was developed independently, but the Dragonfly has larger airfoils and a smaller engine, resulting in a slower but more docile handling aircraft. Its forward  span wing employs a GU25-5(11)8 mod airfoil, when the aft wing (span 22 ft) uses an Eppler 1212 airfoil. Standard engines used include the  Volkswagen air-cooled engine and the  Jabiru 2200 four-stroke powerplants. Construction time from the supplied kit is estimated as 700 hours, while from plans is estimated at over 1200 hours.

Operational history
The Dragonfly was given the Outstanding New Design Award at the EAA Convention in 1980. By 1998, 500 examples of all variants were reported as flying.

Variants

Dragonfly Mk I
Original version with main landing gear mounted in fairings at the lower wing tips. Operations require paved runways and wide taxiways due to widely spaced main wheels.
Dragonfly Mk II
Version with conventional landing gear.
Dragonfly Mk III
Version with tricycle landing gear.

Specifications (Mark III Millenium)

See also
Similar aircraft
 Rutan Quickie
 QAC Quickie Q2

References

 Jackson, Paul. Jane's All The World's Aircraft 2003–2004. Coulsdon, UK: Jane's Information Group, 2003. .

External links

Photo of a Dragonfly Mk III

Aircraft first flown in 1980
Homebuilt aircraft
Tandem-wing aircraft
Single-engined tractor aircraft